Tarab is an album by the Lebanese oud player and composer Rabih Abou-Khalil, fusing traditional Arab music with jazz, which was recorded in 1992 and released on the Enja label the following year.

Reception

The Allmusic review by Kurt Keefner called it " an album that certainly does not lack for atmosphere, but which would have benefited from greater tunefulness. Still, a very worthy effort" but stated it was "not the best place to start one's Rabih Abou-Khalil collection, especially if one is coming from a jazz background".

Track listing
All compositions by Rabih Abou-Khalil
 "Bushman in the Desert" – 8:02
 "After Dinner" – 5:52
 "Awakening" – 8:06
 "Haneen Wa Hanaan" – 8:07
 "Lost Centuries" – 7:10
 "In Search of the Well" – 3:38
 "Orange Fields" – 9:38
 "A Tooth Lost" – 5:20
 "Arabian Waltz" - 4:59

Personnel
Rabih Abou-Khalil – oud
Glen Moore – bass
Ramesh Shotham – South Indian drums, percussion
Nabil Khaiat – frame drum, percussion

References

Rabih Abou-Khalil albums
1993 albums
Enja Records albums